Ellesmere railway station is a disused station in Ellesmere, Shropshire, England. The station was opened on 4 May 1863, closed to passengers on 18 January 1965 and closed completely on 29 March 1965.

Station site today and possible developments
The site of the former station has been swept away including the trackbed to Wrexham and Oswestry by modern housing and redevelopments which are now on all the former sidings, goods yard and trackbed. The station building survives and is a Grade II listed building, albeit derelict and disused. The former station drive serves as an access road to an industrial estate north of the station site.

In 2018, there were plans to redevelop the site to houses and station building into flats but this has caused opposition due to the problems with the main roads as well as likely causing traffic congestion.

See also
Listed buildings in Ellesmere Urban

References

Further reading

Disused railway stations in Shropshire
Railway stations in Great Britain opened in 1863
Railway stations in Great Britain closed in 1965
Former Cambrian Railway stations
Beeching closures in England
Ellesmere, Shropshire